Project My World is a reality television series that was broadcast on American satellite TV channel, The 101 Network, an exclusive service of DirecTV. The ten-part series premiered on October 16, 2006 and was shown on Monday nights.

The show followed three women as they traveled the world meeting up with their friends and unsigned bands, all of whom had accounts on MySpace. The program was produced in various European countries over a 30-day period.

The show's hosts, creators and executive producers are actresses/hosts Renee Intlekofer and Shaina Fewell. Taryn Southern, a friend and another actress, was also part of the cast for the first season, but will not return for an upcoming second season.  An online search eventually produced Southern's replacement, Bridgetta Tomarchio.

Project My World traveled to Australia and New Zealand in the second season which premiered on October 1, 2007.

About the hosts
Intlekofer is a former professional wrestler who has a degree in sociology from UCLA; she is originally from Oregon.
Fewell grew up on a farm in Indiana and is a music video director.
Bridgetta Tomarchio is originally from Baltimore, Maryland and has been a backup dancer and snake handler. She has performed at some Britney Spears concerts.

Cities visited 2006

Valencia, Spain
Barcelona, Spain
Saint-Tropez, France
Munich, Germany
Verona, Italy
Venice, Italy
Split, Croatia
Paris, France
Ramstein, Germany
London, England

Cities visited 2007

Auckland, New Zealand
Christchurch, New Zealand
Queenstown, New Zealand
Sydney, Australia
Jindabyne, Australia
Hanging Rock, Australia
Melbourne, Australia
Brisbane, Australia
Cairns, Australia

Performing bands 2007

Dead inside the chrysalis
Midnight Youth
The Dukes
Sunburn
Pluto
Elias
Super-Ok!
MC Lesson
Angelas Dish
Kanvas Grey
Dead Day Sun
Skybombers

Events and activities on the show

Tomatillo Festival (Spain)
Hot air balloon Riding (Spain)
Oktoberfest (Germany)
Indoor skydiving (England)
Rappelling (Germany)

Events and activities on the show

Zorbing
Bungee jumping
Winterfest/Queenstown, NZ
Skydiving Great Barrier Reef
V8 car racing
dirt bikes

External links
Website of show

2000s American reality television series
2006 American television series debuts
2007 American television series endings
Audience (TV network) original programming